Black Vulcan is an African-American superhero on the animated series Super Friends created by Hanna-Barbera, voiced by Buster Jones.

Fictional character biography
Black Vulcan debuted on the Super Friends show (The All-New Super Friends Hour) in September 1977. Unlike most of the Super Friends, Black Vulcan was not a pre-existing DC Comics character. This is particularly notable since DC Comics' roster did include an African American superhero with electricity-based powers, Black Lightning, who could not be used on the show due to disputes between DC and Black Lightning's creator Tony Isabella. In retaliation, Isabella wrote the story "The Other Black Lightning", which was published in Black Lightning #10, in which a criminal named Barbara Hanna (a pun on Hanna-Barbera) and her circus hire a Black Lightning imposter named Jocko. At the end, Black Lightning and Jocko make up and the former believes the latter could strike out on his own, that is, if he stops imitating him, of course. Isabella has said "I don't think anyone noticed what I was doing there". The costume, model sheets, and early storyboards for Black Vulcan were designed by cartoonist Alex Toth, responsible for the look of most Hanna-Barbera superheroes.

Black Vulcan appeared in The All-New Super Friends Hour cartoon series (episode "The Whirlpool"). His catchphrase was "Great Lightning!" and in the earlier episodes, he shouted his name a la previous Hanna-Barbera superheroes Space Ghost and Birdman.

In the final incarnation of the series, The Super Powers Team: Galactic Guardians, he was replaced by Cyborg, another black superhero who is already well-established in the DC Comics.

Powers and abilities
Black Vulcan's powers include the ability to project bolts of electricity from his hands. By charging his lower body with energy, he can fly at superhuman speeds. On a few occasions, he has exhibited capabilities not shown before, such as converting his physical form into pure energy and traveling through lightspeed (in an unsuccessful attempt to escape a black hole). He was able to open a rift in spacetime via energy fluctuation. Black Vulcan is capable of spot welding microelectronics.

In other media

Television
 Black Vulcan appears in Harvey Birdman, Attorney at Law, voiced by Phil LaMarr. This version describes his powers as "pure electricity... in my pants", which becomes a running gag throughout the series, and considered going by the codename "Supervolt" before calling himself Black Vulcan at Aquaman's suggestion despite believing it was a racial slur. In his most notable appearance in the episode "Very Personal Injury", Black Vulcan and Apache Chief, among other superheroes, form the "Multicultural Pals".
 A character inspired by Black Vulcan named Juice appears in Justice League Unlimited, voiced by an uncredited CCH Pounder. He is an electrokinetic, genetically-engineered superhero created by Project Cadmus to serve as a member of their Ultimen and operate independently of the Justice League, though the former group are led to believe that they are regular metahumans. Additionally, due to his powers, Juice speaks with a raspy voice that causes him to sound like he is speaking through a low-quality speaker or radio. In the episode "Ultimatum", the Ultimen discover the truth behind their creation and that they are suffering from cellular breakdown. They attack their manager Maxwell Lord in an attempt to find Cadmus member Amanda Waller, only to be thwarted by the League and taken back into Cadmus' custody. In the episode "Panic in the Sky", Cadmus utilizes an army of Ultimen clones in their siege on the League's Watchtower.
 Black Vulcan serves as inspiration for Young Justices incarnation of Static, voiced by Bryton James.

Film
 Black Vulcan makes a cameo appearance in Scooby-Doo! Mask of the Blue Falcon.
 Black Vulcan makes a cameo appearance in The Lego Batman Movie.

Toys
 Black Vulcan received a figure in the Justice League Unlimited tie-in toyline as part of a three-pack with Apache Chief and Samurai.
 A 6" Black Vulcan action figure was released in Wave 18 of Mattel's DC Universe Classics line.
 Black Vulcan received an 8-inch action figure by the Figures Toy Company.
 Black Vulcan received a Lego mini-figure in Series 2 of the Lego Batman mini-figure line.

Comics
 Comic book artist and Super Friends fan Alex Ross intended to create a modernized version of Black Vulcan for his rejected Captain Marvel series. The title would have had the character reimagined as Vulcan, an African-American child who could become an adult superhero after accidentally gaining some of the wizard Shazam's powers.
 Black Vulcan made a cameo appearance in the DC One Million 80-Page Giant special as a member of an alternate universe Justice League, one of several that accidentally ended up in the Justice Legion Alpha's headquarters.

References

African-American superheroes
Black characters in animation
Characters created by Alex Toth
DC Comics metahumans
DC Comics male superheroes
Fictional African-American people
Fictional characters with electric or magnetic abilities
Super Friends characters
Television characters introduced in 1977
Fictional characters who can move at superhuman speeds